Mitraguraleus is a genus of sea snails, marine gastropod mollusks in the family Mangeliidae.

This is now considered a subgenus Guraleus (Mitraguraleus) Laseron, 1954

Distribution
This marine genus is endemic to Australia and occurs off New South Wales, South Australia, Tasmania, Victoria and Western Australia

Species
Species brought into synonymy:
 Mitraguraleus australis (A. Adams & G.F. Angas, 1864) synonym of Guraleus australis  (A. Adams & G.F. Angas, 1864)

References

 Laseron, C. 1954. Revision of the New South Wales Turridae (Mollusca). Australian Zoological Handbook. Sydney : Royal Zoological Society of New South Wales 1-56, pls 1-12.

External links
  Bouchet P., Kantor Yu.I., Sysoev A. & Puillandre N. (2011) A new operational classification of the Conoidea. Journal of Molluscan Studies 77: 273-308.
  Tucker, J.K. 2004 Catalog of recent and fossil turrids (Mollusca: Gastropoda). Zootaxa 682:1-1295.
 Worldwide Mollusk Data base : Mangeliidae

 
Gastropod genera